= Ürümqi Solar Farm =

Solar power plant in Xinjiang, China

The Ürumqi Solar Farm is a Photovoltaic power station located near Ürümqi, the capital of Xinjiang in China. It is the world largest solar farm in terms of capacity with 3.5 GW. The farm produces 6.1 billion kWh by year and covers an area of 32,947 acres.
